Francis Ayscough (1701–1763) was a tutor to George III and Clerk of the Closet to his father Frederick, Prince of Wales and later Dean of Bristol Cathedral.

Biography
Francis was born in the English county of Surrey on 19 December 1701 and baptised on 25 December in St Olave's Church, Southwark; he had his early education in Winchester and at John Roysse's Free School in Abingdon (now Abingdon School). He applied to be a fellow at the University of Oxford after serving two years at Corpus Christi. Although initially rejected he was admitted after the intercession of the Bishop of Winchester, Richard Willis, who threatened to sack all of those involved if Ayscough was not appointed in 15 minutes.

He was appointed as the first tutor to George who was to be the future King George III of Great Britain. Reportedly Ayscough was appointed by the intercession of Sir George Lyttlelton, who had some influence with George's father. Ayscough had married Anne Lyttleton who was George's sister.

In 1735 it was Ayscough as Chaplain to the Prince of Wales who was called on to give a sermon to the House of Commons to commemorate the "martyrdom of Charles I".

The boy's father retained Francis' services, but in 1749 he made a further appointment of an assistant to Ayscough. The new assistant, Lewis Scott, was a mathematician and a member of the Royal Society and it was through him that George III became the first British monarch to have a scientific education.

On the death of Frederick in 1751  Ayscough and North were both replaced by the Whig politicians. Ayscough was replaced by the Bishop of Norwich, Thomas Hayter.

In 1754 he officiated at the wedding of William Pitt and Hester Grenville.  In 1755 he had a sermon published on the wrongs of "self murder".

In 1756, Ayscough became the Canon (of 12th prebend) for Winchester Cathedral, 1756–1763, Ayscough was also appointed to be the Dean of Bristol in 1761, a post that he also held until his death which took place in Bristol on 16 August 1763; he was buried in Bristol Cathedral three days later. Anne, his wife, outlived him and died in their house in London in 1776 aged 64. Ayscough's children included Anne Augusta who became Lady Cockburn, and George Edward Ayscough who was a Guards officer and sometime dramatist.

See also
 List of Old Abingdonians

References

Clerks of the Closet
Deans of Bristol
1701 births
1763 deaths
People from Winchester
People educated at Abingdon School